Otto von Friesen (11 May 1870 in Kulltorp – 10 September 1942) was a linguist, runologist and professor of the Swedish language at Uppsala University from 1906 to 1935.  He was also a member of the Swedish Academy from 1929 to 1942, serving in Chair 9.

Friesen began teaching in Nordic Languages at Uppsala University in 1897 and finished his dissertation there in 1898.  He became a Professor of Swedish in 1906.

Published works include Om de germanska mediageminatorna (1897), Till den nordiska språkhistorien (1901 and 1906), as well as Om runskriftens härkomst (1904–06), Vår äldsta handskrift på fornsvänska (1906) and "Kylverstenen" (in Antiqv. tidskrift, vol. XVIII).

References

"Friesen, Otto von", Nordisk Familjebok, 1904-1926 pp. 1407-1408.

External links
 

1870 births
1942 deaths
Linguists from Sweden
Members of the Swedish Academy
Academic staff of Uppsala University
Burials at Uppsala old cemetery
Members of the Royal Gustavus Adolphus Academy